The Birmingham, Columbus and St. Andrews Railroad was a railroad running from Chipley, Florida to Southport, Florida. The railroad was chartered in 1903 and completed construction in 1912. The railroad was reorganized as the Alabama and Western Florida Railroad in 1926 and ceased operations in 1939.

The Birmingham, Columbus and St. Andrews Railroad was chartered in Alabama in 1903, and registered in Florida the same year. Construction started in Chipley that year, initially using a few miles of right-of-way previously graded for the Dothan, Hartford and Florida Railroad. Approximately  of track from Chipley to Macon, Florida were completed by 1908. The railroad was placed in receivership that year, and was still under receivership in 1927. Another  of track were laid in late 1911 and early 1912, extending from Macon to Tiller, Florida, where a connection was made to a track owned by the Sales-Davis Company, a lumber company. The Birmingham, Columbus and Florida railroad leased trackage rights over the almost  of the Sales-Davis Company railroad extending from Tiller to Southport. The only connection to another railroad was to the Louisville and Nashville at Chipley. Freight traffic on the railroad consisted primarily of lumber from the Sales-Davis mill in Southport.

The assets of the Birmingham, Columbus and St. Andrews Railroad were sold in 1926 and incorporated in the Alabama and Western Florida Railroad. Passenger and freight traffic declined in the 1930s. The railroad was placed under receivership in 1936. Passenger carriage was stopped in 1938. The railroad ceased operations in 1939.

Notes

References 

Defunct Florida railroads